Langford is a village and civil parish in the Central Bedfordshire district of the county of Bedfordshire, England about  south-east of the county town of Bedford. The 2011 census gives the population as 3,091.

Geography

The East Coast Main Line railway passes through the parish at the eastern edge of the village.

Landscape

The village is within the Bedfordshire and Cambridgeshire Claylands National Character Area (NCA 88) as defined by Natural England. Central Bedfordshire Council has classified the local landscape as Lower Ivel Clay Valley for the northern part of the village and parish and Upper Ivel Clay Valley for the southern part. Large, open arable fields dominate to the east of the village.

Henlow Common and Langford Meadows local nature reserve is beside the Ivel. Lakes formed from old sand and gravel quarries are to the south of the village.

Seven of the ten wind turbines commissioned in 2013 at Biggleswade Wind Farm are within the parish. To the southeast of the village is a solar farm commissioned in 2015. The two installations have electrical generating capacities of 20 MW and 13 MW respectively.

Elevation

The land rises to over  towards Topler's Hill in the east of the parish.

Geology and soil type

Langford village lies on river gravel and the arable fields to the east on boulder clay over Gault. The village itself has highly fertile, freely draining, slightly acid but base-rich soil with a loamy texture. By the Ivel are loamy and clayey floodplain soils, with moderate fertility and naturally high groundwater. To the east are highly fertile, lime-rich loamy and clayey soils with impeded drainage.

Roads and footpaths

The B659 road (formerly A6001) (High Street/Church Street) is the main route through the village, leading north to Biggleswade and south to Henlow. Cambridge Road runs east to the A1 road from the southern end of the village. Station Road links Church Street to Cambridge Road.

A public bridleway leads from Common Road to Henlow. Separate footpaths from Station Road and Cambridge Road join to reach Astwick and Stotfold. There are paths from East Road to Biggleswade.

The night sky and light pollution

The Campaign to Protect Rural England (CPRE) divides the level of night sky brightness into 9 bands with band 1 being the darkest i.e. with the lowest level of light pollution and band 9 the brightest and most polluted. Langford is in bands 4 and 5.

History

The village is of Saxon origin, first mentioned in 944 AD and at one time it had one or more fording points across the river. The name is based on the words long ford from the length of the settlement. At the time of the Domesday Book 1086, the population was around 21. The parish church is St. Andrew's, which is part of the Church of England. Before 1066 the lord of Langford was Lewin, a thane of Edward the Confessor. William the Conqueror granted the village to Walter le Fleming. In 1142 Walter's descendant Simon de Wahull gave land to the Knights Templar, who established themselves as Lords of the Manor of Langford Rectory.

The entry in the Domesday Book reads: Langeford: Walter of Flanders. 2 mills.

Langford has been a settlement on the east bank of the river Ivel since Saxon times. It is a long straggling village which at one time had two or three fording points over the river, hence its name. The village now starts at the Baulk corner and it is nearly two miles to the Running Waters at the north end of the village.

Governance
Langford Parish Council consists of ten elected councillors.

Langford is part of Stotfold and Langford ward for elections to the Central Bedfordshire Unitary Authority.

Prior to 1894, Langford was administered as part of the Hundred of Biggleswade.
From 1894 until 1974 it was in Biggleswade Rural District and from 1974 to 2009 in Mid Bedfordshire District.

Langford was in the Mid Bedfordshire parliamentary constituency until 1997. Now in North East Bedfordshire, the elected member is Richard Fuller of the Conservative Party.

Facilities
Langford Village Academy for four to nine year olds is part of the Bedfordshire Schools Trust (BEST). OFSTED rated the school as "good" following an inspection in 2017.

The Plough, Church Street, first licensed in 1846 is the one remaining pub. The building was formerly a farmhouse.

A small shopping parade on Church Street near to East Road includes a convenience store, Fish and chip/burger take away, pharmacy and hair salon. A convenience store on High Street includes the village Post Office.

The King George V Playing Field has a children's play area and exercise equipment for adults. The village hall is within the grounds. Both are owned and maintained by the parish council.

Local commerce includes a long-established garden centre, a garage and filling station, a private members' club (The Ivy Leaf Club), farm shop, estate agents, curry house (Spice Lounge), small café (The Hideaway), and a dog grooming boutique.

Public services
Langford falls within Anglian Water's Potton Public Water Supply Zone. The water is chloraminated and hard. The supply comes from groundwater boreholes. Poppy Fields waste water treatment works is south of the village, alongside the railway.

The Eastern Power Area of UK Power Networks is the distribution network operator for electricity. Cadent Gas owns and operates the area's gas distribution network.
The two nearest general hospitals are Bedford (Bedford Hospital NHS Trust) and Lister Hospital, Stevenage (East and North Hertfordshire NHS Trust). 
Ambulance services are provided by the East of England Ambulance Service NHS Trust. Bedfordshire Fire and Rescue Service and Bedfordshire Police cover the parish.

The nearest public library is Biggleswade.

Public transport
Centrebus (South) runs an hourly route south to Henlow and Hitchin (journey time 35 minutes) and north to Biggleswade and Sandy via Dunton, Wrestlingworth and Potton (service 188) or Sutton, Potton, Gamlingay, and Everton (service 190).

Weekly services to Cambridge and Bedford are run by community bus operators Ivel Sprinter and Wanderbus respectively. Wanderbus also operates monthly services to St Neots, Milton Keynes and Welwyn Garden City.

The nearest railway stations are Biggleswade and Arlesey.

Churches

The parish church of St Andrew is part of a united benefice with the Church of St Mary the Virgin, Henlow. Regular Sunday morning services are held.

The Methodist Chapel is in the North Bedfordshire Circuit. Services take place each Sunday morning. The Chapel was constructed in 1862. The two-manual organ, built in 1845 by Gray and Davison, was initially installed at St John the Baptist Church, Windsor before being sold and transferred here in 1906. In 2000, the organ was issued with an ungraded Historic Organ Certificate.

Buildings and monuments
Upon entering the village from Biggleswade is a terrace of ten cottages dated 1862: the Denny Cottages are of yellow brick with red brick trimmings. All bar one have arched front windows and doors.

The Clock Tower Memorial commemorates soldiers who lost their lives in the 1914–18 and 1939–45 World Wars.

Housing developments
The village has grown considerably since 1961.  Housing on Riverside Gardens, at the southern end of the village between the Ivel and High Street was built in the late 1960s, followed by nearby Wilmon Court and Ivel Close in the 1980s.

More recently, Garfield, off Station Road, comprising 58 properties was completed in 2010 on former scrubland. The pace of development accelerated following Central Bedfordshire Council's initial call for sites in 2014. At the north of the village on the western side of Church Street is a development of 35 properties called Rowley Fields, built in 2018 on a former meadow. Off the east side of Station Road, 110 houses have been built at Bramble Corner, Mayflower Lane, Campion Edge and Elderberry Close and off the west side another 25 at Merryweather Grove. 22 houses have been completed at Steamer Croft beside the railway off Cambridge Road.

Sport
Langford F.C. compete in the Spartan South Midlands League Division One and play their home matches at Forde Park. The women's team currently compete in the South East Combination Women's League. A few seasons ago, they were members of the Women's Premier League, playing against teams such as Chelsea, Ipswich Town and Millwall.

King George's Field is the home of the Langford Youth football team and Langford Cricket Club. Langford Tennis Club has two floodlit courts and compete in the Bedfordshire LTA leagues.

Community events
An annual themed raft race is held on the Ivel in July. Costumed competitors are flour bombed by spectators on the river bank and bridges. Money is raised for local clubs. The village fete follows.

Notable residents
The late A.W. Lawrence, Professor of Archaeology at the University of Cambridge, youngest brother of T. E. Lawrence (Lawrence of Arabia), lived in Langford with his wife for a time in the 1980s.

Ben Whishaw, stage and film actor who plays Q in recent James Bond episodes, spent part of his childhood in Langford; he attended local schools as well as taking part in local amateur theatre productions in the village.

References

External links

 
 2001 Census - Parish profile for Langford

Villages in Bedfordshire
Civil parishes in Bedfordshire
Biggleswade
Central Bedfordshire District